Long Lake is an unincorporated community and census-designated place (CDP) in Lake County, Illinois, United States. Per the 2020 census, the population was 3,663.

Geography
The community is in western Lake County and nearly surrounds Long Lake, which drains northwest via Squaw Creek to Fox Lake, part of the Chain O'Lakes of northern Illinois. The CDP is bordered to the northeast by the village of Round Lake Heights and to the east and south by the village of Round Lake Beach. The CDP is primarily in the eastern part of Grant Township, with a smaller portion in the northwest corner of Avon Township, and an area of about one city block in the southwest corner of Lake Villa Township.

Illinois Route 134 runs along the southern edge of the CDP, leading west  to U.S. Route 12 in the southern part of Fox Lake and southeast through Round Lake Beach  to Hainesville.

Demographics

2020 census

Note: the US Census treats Hispanic/Latino as an ethnic category. This table excludes Latinos from the racial categories and assigns them to a separate category. Hispanics/Latinos can be of any race.

2000 Census
As of the census of 2000, there were 3,356 people, 1,150 households, and 857 families residing in the CDP. The racial makeup of the CDP was 93.33% White, 0.33% African American, 0.33% Native American, 0.72% Asian, 4.41% from other races, and 0.89% from two or more races. Hispanic or Latino of any race were 11.53% of the population.

There were 1,150 households, out of which 40.1% had children under the age of 18 living with them, 59.0% were married couples living together, 10.0% had a female householder with no husband present, and 25.4% were non-families. 18.7% of all households were made up of individuals, and 4.8% had someone living alone who was 65 years of age or older. The average household size was 2.92 and the average family size was 3.33.

In the CDP, the population was spread out, with 30.2% under the age of 18, 8.3% from 18 to 24, 35.5% from 25 to 44, 19.3% from 45 to 64, and 6.8% who were 65 years of age or older. The median age was 33 years. For every 100 females, there were 108.7 males. For every 100 females age 18 and over, there were 105.4 males.

The median income for a household in the CDP was $57,179, and the median income for a family was $61,378. Males had a median income of $41,875 versus $29,919 for females. The per capita income for the CDP was $21,034. About 2.0% of families and 3.8% of the population were below the poverty line, including 2.4% of those under age 18 and 19.6% of those age 65 or over.

References

Census-designated places in Illinois
Unincorporated communities in Illinois
Census-designated places in Lake County, Illinois